Belgian-Greek relations are foreign relations between Belgium and Greece. Both countries established direct diplomatic relations in 1874.  Belgium has an embassy in Athens and 7 honorary consulates in Corfu, Iraklion, Mytilini, Patras, Piraeus, Rhodes and Thessaloniki.  Since 1945, Greece has an embassy in Brussels.

Both countries are full members of NATO and of the European Union.  There are between 15,000 and 26,000 Greeks who live in Belgium. The Belgian School at Athens dates back to the 1960s and was officially accredited in 1985, it is one of the 17 foreign archaeological institutes in Athens.

Diplomacy

Republic of Belgium
Athens (Embassy)

Republic of Greece
Brussels (Embassy)

See also 
 Foreign relations of Belgium
 Foreign relations of Greece
 Greeks in Belgium

External links 
 Belgian Ministry of Foreign Affairs, International Trade and Cooperation for Development about relations with Greece (in French only)
  Belgian embassy in Athens
 Greek Ministry of Foreign Affairs about relations with Belgium
 Greek embassy in Brussels

 
Belgium
Greece